Zhu Gui is the name of:

Zhu Gui (prince) (1374–1446), Ming dynasty prince
Zhu Gui (printmaker) ( 1644–1717), Qing dynasty woodcarver
Zhu Gui (Water Margin), fictional Song dynasty hero from the novel Water Margin